Tua Pek Kong Temple is a Chinese temple situated right next to the Miri Fish Market in Miri, Sarawak, Malaysia. It is the oldest temple in the present-day Miri city.

History 
Since the oil boom of Miri in the early 1900s, the town population increased rapidly before an unknown epidemic began to struck the town which resulting to the deaths of many of the town population. The local Chinese residents believed the epidemic is caused by evil spirits roaming around the area with a Chinese man named Chan Chak began to calling a monk to appease the spirits with spirit-pacifying ritual being carried out near the Miri River with an altar being placed there. With the epidemic began to subsided following the ritual, the local Chinese residents constructed a temple near the river to revere Tua Pek Kong as a gratitude to the latter in 1913. The temple stays until this day where it survived the Japanese bombings on the town during World War II. It was renovated in 1977. In 2017, a new paifang has been constructed for the temple.

References 

Miri, Malaysia
Religious buildings and structures completed in 1913
Chinese-Malaysian culture
Taoist temples in Malaysia
Buildings and structures in Sarawak
Tourist attractions in Sarawak